Ophir Airport  is a state-owned public-use airport located in Ophir, in the Yukon-Koyukuk Census Area of the U.S. state of Alaska.

This airport is included in the FAA's National Plan of Integrated Airport Systems for 2011–2015 which categorized it as a general aviation facility.

Facilities and aircraft 
Ophir Airport has one runway designated 11/29 with a turf and gravel surface measuring 1,940 by 60 feet (591 x 18 m).

References

External links 
 FAA Alaska airport diagram (GIF)
 Topographic map as of 1 July 1954 from USGS The National Map

Airports in the Yukon–Koyukuk Census Area, Alaska